Macrobathra cineralella is a moth in the family Cosmopterigidae. It is found on the Indian Ocean island of Réunion.

References
Viette, P. 1957c. Lépidoptères (excepté les Tordeuses et les Géométrides). – In: La Faune entomologique de l'Ile de la Réunion. I. - Mémoires de l'Institut scientifique de Madagascar (E)8:137–226; pls. 1–4.

Macrobathra
Moths described in 1957